Igurusi is an administrative ward in the Mbarali district of the Mbeya Region of Tanzania. In 2016 the Tanzania National Bureau of Statistics report there were 24,573 people in the ward, from 22,296 in 2012.

The ward is famous for rice farming and most of its residents depend from rice farming. The ward has nine villages which are; Chamoto, Igurusi, Ilolo, Lunwa, Lusese, Maendeleo, Majenje, Rwanyo and Uhambule.

Igurusi is home to Ministry of Agriculture Training Institute (MATI-Igurusi). The institution offers two diploma courses in land use and irrigation. Also there are eight primary schools and three secondary schools, which are Igurusi,Mshikamano and Haroun Pirmohamed. There is an international rice market within the ward. An ATM service is available for CRDB Bank within the market. The TANZAM Highway from Dar es Salaam to Mbeya passes through the ward,Also the TAZARA railway is passing through the ward.

The ward comprises many tribes and most of them are Nyakyusa, Ndali, Sangu, Bena,Wanji,Kinga, Nyiha and Safwa. The ward lies within the famous Usangu plains bordered with the Livingstone mountains on the southside of the ward where Mbeya rural district and Njombe region bordered the ward. Igurusi ward is one amongst the wards in Mbarali district which grow rapidly and the ward is no longer a village-like place, but a suburban-like place.

Villages and hamlets 
The ward has 9 villages, and 49 hamlets.

 Chamoto
 Bethania
 Godauni
 Kibaoni
 Majimaji
 Mkuyuni
 Mpakani
 Igurusi
 Kabwe
 Muungano 'A'
 Muungano 'B'
 Zahanati 'A'
 Zahanati 'B'
 Ilolo
 Ilolo 'A'
 Ilolo 'B'
 Machinjioni
 Mati
 Mbuyuni
 Lusese
 Kanisani
 Lusese
 Majengo mapya 'A'
 Majengo mapya 'B'
 Masista
 Maendeleo
 Chemichemi
 Juhudi
 Maendeleo 'A'
 Maendeleo 'B'
 Mahakamani
 Majenje
 Jipemoyo
 Kiwanjani
 Majenje juu 'A'
 Majenje juu 'B'
 Mji mwema
 Lunwa
 Chamgungwe
 Kanalunwa
 Mapunga
 Mashala
 Lunwa
 Rwanyo
 Amkeni 'A'
 Amkeni 'B'
 Jangwani 'A'
 Jangwani 'B'
 Ruanda
 Uhambule
 Gomoshelo
 Kibaoni
 Lyamasoko
 Lyovela
 Matowo
 Mganga
 Mkwajuni
 Mpogoro
 Nganga

References 

Wards of Mbeya Region